Hormurus is a genus of scorpions, commonly known as rainforest scorpions, in the family Hormuridae, that occur in rainforest habitats, mainly in Australia and Melanesia. The genus was first described by Swedish arachnologist Tamerlan Thorell in 1876.

Species
Species include:
 Hormurus boholiensis Kraepelin, 1914 - Philippines
 Hormurus ischnoryctes Monod & Prendini, 2013 - Australia
 Hormurus karschii Keyserling, 1885 - Australia and New Guinea
 Hormurus litodactylus (Monod & Volschenk, 2004) - Australia
 Hormurus longimanus (Locket, 1995)  - Australia
 Hormurus macrochela Monod, 2013 - Australia
 Hormurus neocaledonicus (Simon, 1877) - New Caledonia
 Hormurus ochyroscapter Monod, 2013 - Australia
 Hormurus penta (Francke & Lourenco, 1991) - New Guinea and Solomon Islands
 Hormurus polisorum (Volschenk, Locket & Harvey, 2001) - Christmas Island
 Hormurus waigiensis (Gervais, 1943) - Australia and New Guinea

References

 

 
 
Scorpion genera
Taxa named by Tamerlan Thorell